John Alwyne Kitching  (24 October 1908–1 April 1996) was a British biologist.

He was educated at Cheltenham College, Trinity College, Cambridge and the University of London. He was a Lecturer at Birkbeck, University of London, the University of Edinburgh, the University of Bristol and a Rockefeller Fellow at Princeton University. He was Professor of Biology at the University of East Anglia from 1963 to 1974 then Emeritus Professor, and also served as Dean of School of Biological Sciences from 1967 to 1970. He was made an OBE in 1947 and a Fellow of the Royal Society in 1960.

References

1908 births
1996 deaths
People educated at Cheltenham College
Alumni of Trinity College, Cambridge
Alumni of the University of London
Academics of Birkbeck, University of London
Academics of the University of Edinburgh
Academics of the University of Bristol
Princeton University faculty
Academics of the University of East Anglia
Fellows of the Royal Society
Officers of the Order of the British Empire